Arbër Hoxha (born 6 October 1998) is a Kosovan professional footballer who plays as a left winger for Croatian club Slaven Belupo and the Kosovo national team.

Club career

Lokomotiva
On 5 July 2021, Hoxha joined Croatian First League side Lokomotiva. On 14 August 2021, he made his debut in a 4–0 home win against Istra 1961 after coming on as a substitute at 70th minute in place of Lukas Kačavenda.

Slaven Belupo
On 8 February 2022, Hoxha signed a three-year contract with Croatian First League club Slaven Belupo. Ten days later, he made his debut in a 0–3 away win against Gorica after coming on as a substitute at 80th minute in place of Hansel Zapata.

International career

Under-21
On 14 March 2018, Hoxha received a call-up from Kosovo U21 for the 2019 UEFA European Under-21 Championship qualification matches against Azerbaijan and Germany. His debut came on 15 October 2019 in a 2021 UEFA European Under-21 Championship qualification match against Albania after coming on as a substitute at 78th minute in place of Ismet Lushaku and assists in his side's only goal during a 2–1 away defeat.

Senior
On 24 December 2019, Hoxha received a call-up from Kosovo for the friendly match against Sweden, and made his debut after coming on as a substitute at 46th minute in place of Zymer Bytyqi. On 11 June 2021, Hoxha scored his first goal for Kosovo in his third appearance for the country in a 1–0 home minimal win over Gambia.

Career statistics

Club

International

|+ List of international goals scored by Arbër HoxhaScores and results list Kosovo's goal tally first, score column indicates score after each Hoxha goal.
|-
|1.
|11 June 2021
|Arslan Zeki Demirci Sports Complex, Manavgat, Turkey
|
|align="center"|1–0
|align="center"|1–0
|Friendly
|
|}

References

External links

1998 births
Living people
Sportspeople from Peja
Kosovan footballers
Kosovo under-21 international footballers
Kosovo international footballers
Association football wingers
Football Superleague of Kosovo players
FC Prishtina players
KF Hajvalia players
KF Besa players
KF Ballkani players
Croatian Football League players
NK Lokomotiva Zagreb players
NK Slaven Belupo players